WRRW may refer to:

 Waingapu Airport (ICAO code WRRW)
 WRRW-LP, a defunct low-power radio station (100.9 FM) formerly licensed to serve Williamsburg, Virginia, United States